The Enggano cuckoo-dove (Macropygia cinnamomea) is a species of bird in the family Columbidae. It is endemic to Enggano Island in Indonesia. Until 2016, it was considered a subspecies of the ruddy cuckoo-dove.

References 

Ng, E.Y.X., J.A. Eaton, P. Verbelen, R.O. Hutchinson, and F.E. Rheindt. 2016. Using bioacoustic data to test species limits in an Indo-Pacific island radiation of Macropygia cuckoo doves. Biological Journal of the Linnean Society 118: 786–812.

Macropygia
Birds described in 1892